Korsimoro is a town and the capital of the Korsimoro Department, in the Sanmatenga Province of central Burkina Faso. It is situated at 70 km NNE of Ouagadougou on the main road (Route Nationale 3) to Kaya. It had a population of 18,875 (2019).

References 

Populated places in the Centre-Nord Region
Sanmatenga Province